The First Universalist Church is a historic Universalist church building located at 150 S. Clinton Ave. in Rochester, New York. Construction began in September 1907 and was dedicated in October 1908. First Universalist Church is affiliated with the Unitarian Universalist Association and is one of two Unitarian Universalist congregations in Monroe County, New York; the other being the First Unitarian Church of Rochester.

Congregation, beliefs, and programs 
The church conducts one weekly worship service on Sundays, virtually from March 2020 to November 2021 due to the COVID-19 pandemic. In November 2021 they began hybrid worship services, with an online service (via Zoom) happening simultaneously with an in-person service in the building.

The church is diverse and inclusive, having, in the words of its web site, "no shared creed. Our shared covenant (our Seven Principles) supports “the free and responsible search for truth and meaning.”  Though Unitarianism and Universalism were both liberal Christian traditions, some of us embrace diverse teachings from other faiths, hold humanist beliefs, or call ourselves atheists".

The church's mission statement is: "to nurture the spirit, and serve the community".

First Universalist ministers to their congregation, and the external community through a variety of active committees and teams such as:

 The Board of Trustees

 Caring Committee
 Communications Committee
 Finance Committee
 House Committee
Lifespan Faith Development
 Membership Committee
Committee on Ministry
Music Committee
 Nominating Committee
 Personnel Committee
 Faith In Action Council (FIAC)
Social Justice Project Teams(AKA "Social Justice Circles")
 Worship Committee
 COVID Task Force

First Universalist is a Welcoming Congregation, and is recognized as such by the Unitarian Universalist Association.
First Universalist releases a small digital weekly email concerning church events. They also have monthly newsletter, titled "Our Outlook",  that is published on their website as well as sent out physically. Archives of both these publications, along with archives of past sermons and annual reports, can be found on their website.

Black Lives Matter 
During the summer of 2020, First Universalist congregation members supported local Black Lives Matter protests both before and after the news of Daniel Prude's death at the hands of the Rochester Police Department was made public.  Initially they hosted a table of supplies and made the church restroom available. As the protests lasted into the fall of 2020, First Universalist began hosting the Rochester Street Medic Collective.

The medics were hosted in the Clara Barton lounge area of the building, off the parking lot. The medics used this site as a home base for storing supplies and an ad hoc site for medical treatment. Water, food, and other supplies were still being distributed to protestors and medics by church members at this time.

Architecture 
It was designed by noted Rochester architect Claude Fayette Bragdon, and is in the Romanesque Revival style. It is of brick with stone and ceramic tile trim and features a central tower and lantern with pyramidal roofs. The Library of Congress notes describe the building architecture as "Unified in concept, harmonious in proportions and color, the major portion of the structure remains essentially unaltered."

It was added to the National Register of Historic Places on 27 May 1971.

Little Free Library 
First Universalist is home to a Little Free Library, which is regularly stocked with books, clothing, etc. for anyone to peruse or take. The roof suffered damage from an unknown source over the summer of 2019, and has since been shingled, rebuilt, and reinstalled as of September 2019.

Hope-Jones Organ 
First Universalist Church of Rochester is home to a fully preserved Hope-Jones organ, which has been described as sounding "weighty and lush", with large-scaled 8′ stops. Few Hope-Jones organs have survived to the present time.

References

External links

1908 establishments in New York (state)
20th-century Unitarian Universalist church buildings
Churches completed in 1908
Churches in Rochester, New York
Churches on the National Register of Historic Places in New York (state)
Historic American Buildings Survey in New York (state)
National Register of Historic Places in Rochester, New York
Romanesque Revival church buildings in New York (state)
Unitarian Universalist churches in New York (state)
Universalist Church of America churches